Niklas Beck (born 25 March 2001) is a Liechtensteiner footballer who plays as a centre-back for Vaduz II, and the Liechtenstein national team.

Career
Beck made his international debut for Liechtenstein on 25 March 2021 in a 2022 FIFA World Cup qualification match against Armenia.

Career statistics

International

References

External links
 

2001 births
Living people
People from Vaduz
Liechtenstein footballers
Liechtenstein youth international footballers
Liechtenstein under-21 international footballers
Liechtenstein international footballers
Association football central defenders
USV Eschen/Mauren players
FC Ruggell players
Swiss 1. Liga (football) players